Lake Parinacochas (possibly from Aymara parina flamingo, Quechua qucha lake, lagoon, "flamingo lake") is a lake in Ayacucho Region in Peru.

Lake Parinacochas is a shallow brackish lake, with some salt pan areas appearing at low water levels.

Ecology

Flora 
The lake is located in a dry puna grassland region. Aquatic vegetation is represented by reeds of Typha sp. and submerged plants of genus Potamogeton.

See also
Sara Sara
List of lakes in Peru

References

Lakes of Peru
Lakes of Ayacucho Region